Freetown explosion may refer to:

2007 Freetown explosions
Freetown fuel tanker explosion in 2021